Jason Patrick Faunt (born November 20, 1974) is an American actor. He is best known for the role as Wesley Collins in Power Rangers Time Force, as well as his descendant Alex, the former Red Time Force Ranger.

Faunt grew up in the Chicago suburb of McHenry, Illinois. He attended McHenry High School East Campus. Due to his athletic prowess in high school, he used a partial baseball scholarship to attend the University of North Carolina at Asheville, where he earned a business degree. He originally was going to become a Major League Baseball player after graduating, but moved to Los Angeles instead to pursue an acting career.

Jason Faunt has two daughters, Keira and Makayla, with his ex-wife Stephanie. He currently resides in Orange County, California with his two daughters and wife Angela Lin. He appears many times at Power Morphicon for the celebrated Power Rangers franchise. He is also considered to be an important figure alongside Jason David Frank for Power Rangers.

He is set to appear in the upcoming film The Order alongside other Power Rangers alumni.

Filmography

Film
 Legend of the White Dragon (2022)
  The Stalker part II (2022)
 The Order (2017)
 A Pony Tale (2013)
 Pact (2004)
 Jekyll (2004)
 Totem (1999)
 Witchouse (1999)
 Resident Evil: Vendetta - Leon S. Kennedy's motion capture actor.

Television work
 All American (2022) - Bryce
 "Got Your Money"
 Power Rangers Super Ninja Steel  (2018) - Wesley Collins - Red Time Force Ranger (3 episodes)
 "The Poisy Show" (Cameo)
 "Dimensions in Danger"
 "Outfoxed" (Voice Only)
 Power Rangers Super Megaforce (2014) - Wesley Collins - Red Time Force Ranger (Episode:"Legendary Battle")
 Deadliest Warrior (2010)
 Battleground: The Art of WarAlexander the Great (2005) 
 Eve (U.S. TV series) 
 "Condom Mania" (2003)
 "She Snoops to Conquer" (2003)
 Power Rangers Wild Force (2002) - Wesley Collins - Red Time Force Ranger (3 episodes)
 "Forever Red"
 "Reinforcements from the Future: Part 2" 
 "Reinforcements from the Future: Part 1" 
 "Soul Searching" (Voice of Bulldozer Org)
 S Club 7 in Hollywood
 "The Stylist"
 Power Rangers Time Force (2001) - Alex / Wesley Collins - Red Time Force Ranger (40 episodes)
 Port Charles
 Passions

Video games
 Resident Evil 6 (2012) - Leon S. Kennedy motion capture actor
 Power Rangers Time Force (Video Game) (2001) Red Ranger voice actor

Producer
 Pact (2004/I) (producer)

Webseries
 No Nerds Here (2014)

References

External links
 Jason Faunt Official Web Site
 

1974 births
20th-century American male actors
21st-century American male actors
American male film actors
American male television actors
American male voice actors
Living people
Illinois Republicans
Male motion capture actors
People from McHenry, Illinois
University of North Carolina at Asheville alumni